Hongji Grand Stage is the Beijing Opera house located in downtown Dalian, Liaoning, China.

History
During the occupation of Dalian by Japan, there was a teahouse Tenfu Cha-en at this location, now called 59 Minsheng Road, Zhongshan District, Dalian. In 1911, it changed its name to Hozen Cha-en and later changed to Eizen Cha-en. Among the plays that were played there mostly in Japanese, there was also a Beijing Opera "Renmian Taohua", played in Mandarin. A  large-scale reconstruction was begun in 1931 and completed in 1933. In the following year, 1934, a grand opening of Kousai Daibutai (Hongji Dawutai in Chinese or Hongji Grand Stage in English) was held. Among the various plays for the grand opening, there was also a Beijing Opera "Peng-gong-an".

At the end of World War II, Hongji Grand Stage was confiscated by the City of Dalian, and, from 1949, was used as a club for the Dalian Police Department. In 1963, it became the Dalian Lu-Da Pingju Theater, and, in October 2010, returned to its former name of Hongji Grand Stage, which the Dalian Beijing Opera Company started to use as its main theater, after abandoning to use Qilin Grand Stage, the former Higashi Hongan-ji Dalian Buddhist Temple.

In Dalian, there are other important theaters, such as Dalian People's Culture Club, Working People's Theater-Doudou Grand Stage (mainly for Errenzhuan) and Development Area Grand Theater.

Dalian Beijing Opera Company
Dalian Beijing Opera Company is the center of Beijing Opera in Dalian. Although Beijing Opera was played during Japan's occupation of Dalian 1905-1945, the Company was established in April 1949 and changed its name to the current one in May 2007.

Gallery

References

External links
 Dalian Beijing Opera Company

Buildings and structures in Dalian
Peking opera
Chinese opera theatres
Theatre museums in China
Theatres completed in 1931